Gymnopentzia is a genus of African plants in the chamomile tribe within the sunflower family.

The only known species is Gymnopentzia bifurcata, native to Lesotho and South Africa.

References

Anthemideae
Flora of Southern Africa
Monotypic Asteraceae genera